Salavat Yulaev may refer to:
 Salawat Yulayev, Bashkir national hero
 Salavat Yulayev (film), a 1941 Soviet film directed by Yakov Protazanov
 Salavat Yulayev Cave, a cave where the shooting occurred for the film  
 Salawat Yulayev (opera), opera in three acts by the Bashkir composer Zagir Ismagilov
 Salavat Yulaev Ufa, Russian professional ice hockey team based in Ufa
 Salawat Yulayev Award, state award of the Republic of Bashkortostan .